Magah Taneh may refer to:
 Magah Taneh Abul
 Magah Taneh Morad